Airmageddon is a children's technological game show that aired on CBBC from 20 February to 18 December 2016 and is hosted by Will Best and Rachel Stringer. The show involves teams of children using radio-controlled drones.

Format
Airmageddon follows a similar format to the Gauntlet/Trial/Arena format of the first and second series of Robot Wars. The show followed eight heats, two semi-finals and a grand final.

Resident drones

Air Marshall
The referee of the Airena, he announces the start of a challenge and makes sure that things are kept in order.

P.I.G. (Personalised Interactive Gyrocopter)
A pig-shaped drone who demonstrates how each challenge is done. He'll also oversee challenges if the Air Marshall is out of action.

G.U.A.R.D. (Giant Unmanned Aerial Reconnaissance Drone)
A large drone built for defensive purposes and is mentioned to not be the smartest.

D.R.A.GON (Direct Response Aerial Gyrocopter)
A prototype dragon-shaped drone who, true to his namesake, is armed with a flamethrower.

W.A.SP (Weaponised Assault Ship)
A wasp-shaped drone armed with a spark gun stinger.

B.U.G.s (Basic Unmanned Gyrocopter)
A trio of bug-shaped drones introduced for the second series to serve as distractive obstacles in the second round.

Challenges

Round 1

Airsault Course
Information needed

Round 2

The Drop
Information needed

Barrage Balloons
Information needed

Paintball Precision
Information needed

Slalom
Information needed

Wall Buster (Semi-finals)
Information needed

Bubble Burst (Grand final)
Information needed

Laps
Information needed

Bottle Bash
Information needed

Balloon Cutters
Information needed

Round 3

Dogfight
Information needed

Transmissions

Series

Specials

External links
 

2016 British television series debuts
2016 British television series endings
2010s British children's television series
2010s British game shows
BBC children's television shows
British children's game shows
English-language television shows
Robot combat competitions
Robotics competitions
Robotics in the United Kingdom
Television series about children
Television series about robots
Sports entertainment
Television series by DHX Media